Ira Gollobin (July 18, 1911 – April 4, 2008) was a renowned civil rights and immigration attorney who was involved for over seven decades in many high-profile civil liberties, immigration, and extradition cases.  Gollobin wrote extensively on the civil liberties and civil rights of both the native- and foreign-born.   He left a legacy of principled advocacy.  Gollobin was born in Newark, New Jersey to first generation immigration parents from Czechoslovakia and the Ukraine, who had arrived as infants to the United States in 1885 .

Career

Education
Gollobin attended the City College of City University of New York (CCNY) in the late 1920s and 1930s where he developed two lifelong interests:  Latin and law, and was greatly influenced by one of his professors, the eminent Morris Raphael Cohen.  While at CCNY he enrolled in Fordham Law School where he received his LL.B. degree and passed the New York Bar Examination in June 1933.

National Lawyers Guild
Gollobin was a founding member of the National Lawyers Guild (1937) where he was a strong force behind their earliest immigration work.  He served first as associate counsel from 1936-1966 for the American Committee for the Protection of Foreign Born (ACPFB) and then as General Counsel from 1967-1982 where his approach to immigration issues had both legal and political dimensions.  In 1938, Gollobin met Carol Weiss King, another founding member of the National Lawyers Guild and the lead lawyer for the ACPFB. He assisted the League of American Writers from 1937-1938 to successfully get a number of anti-Nazi German writers admitted to the United States and from 1938 through 1940 helped refugees from the Spanish Civil War.  Gollobin was counsel to the Transport Workers Union of America (1939–1940) thereby securing citizenship for almost 1,500 subway workers.  He continued citizenship matters for the Greater New York Industrial Union Council (CIO) from 1940-1942.

Military service
Drafted into the U.S. Army in November 1942 as a Staff Sergeant, Gollobin was assigned to the Judge Advocate General Staff Section in the Philippines.  In January 1946 he was one of the principal organizers of a GI demobilization demonstration movement in Manila and was honorably discharged in March, 1946.

Return to NLG
In 1946, Gollobin represented the National Lawyers Guild-NYC Chapter at the United Nations (1946) and took courses in International Law taught at Columbia Law School by Professor Philip Jessup who went on to serve at the State Department and sit on the International Court of Justice at the Hague.

Anti-HUAC efforts
In the late 1940s until 1966, Gollobin's practice expanded as the need for legal representation for citizens and non-citizens alike called before the House Un-American Activities Committee (HUAC; HUAC) and the Senate International Security Committee.

In 1948 before HUAC, Gollobin provided counsel to Victor Perlo, whom Elizabeth Bentley and Whittaker Chambers alleged had led (Bentley's "Perlo Group") and partaken in (Chambers's "Ware Group") a communist "apparatus" in Washington made up of Federal officials.    (NLG fellow Carol Weiss King represented J. Peters in related hearings.)

In 1960 Gollobin devised a strategy which turned the tables with HUAC as evident in the hearings in April 1964 in Buffalo, NY where witnesses skillfully and relentlessly challenged the legitimacy of the Committee (Pam Sporn).  In 1964 Gollobin fought for 16 years (1951–1967), all the way to the Supreme Court of the United States, before victory was achieved in Hong Hai Chew v. Colding [344 U.S. 590, 595 (1953)].  Gollobin's work with progressive organizations continued throughout the McCarthy period, and his interest in Asia, which dated from his years in the Philippines, impelled him to edit and write for the Far East Reporter from 1953-1986. He served on the board of the Center for Human Rights and Constitutional Law for 25 years, and was a founder of The National Coalition for Haitian Rights. ( Starting in 1972, Gollobin began working with the thousands of Haitian refugees fleeing "Baby Doc" Duvalier's brutal regime, and also collaborated with Father Antoine Adrien and Anthony Cardinal Bevilacqua in this effort. (
.)

Recognition

Ira Gollobin was appointed Managing Attorney to a Commission of Inquiry by the Haitian Fathers and the National Council of Churches where he organized successful judicial attacks for Haitian asylum seekers in Haitian Refugee Center v. Smith 676 F.2d 1023 (5th Cir. 1982).  See also, Harrisiades v. Shaughnessy.  Gollobin testified before the United States Congress, reported to the Congressional Black Caucus, met with various bodies of the United Nations, secured support from legislators Bella Abzug and Shirley Chisholm and finally from President Jimmy Carter to grant the Haitians "entrant status."

Gollobin's commitment and contributions to two immigrant clients was the subject of a column in 1967 by the New York Post journalist James Wechsler.  In recognition of his more than seven decades of legal work and lifelong commitment to social justice, particularly on behalf of the foreign born, Gollobin received numerous awards including from the National Council of Churches, the Center for Immigrants Rights, the American Immigration Lawyers Association (AILA), the National Lawyers Guild and a number of Haitian organizations.  The brilliant attorney Ira Kurzban, author of Kurzban's Immigration Law Sourcebook, as well as the internationally renowned conductor of the Symphony of the United Nations, Joseph Eger (Einstein's Violin, Tarcher/Penguin, 2005) wrote about Gollobin too .

Writing
Ira Gollobin was the author of his self-published Dialectical Materialism:  Its Laws, Categories and Practice (Petras Press, 1986), Winds of Change:  An Immigration Lawyer's Perspective of Fifty Years (1987), and numerous articles on immigration policy, dialectics, East Asia, and Marxist theory that appeared in such publications as The Nation, Immigration Journal, Migration World Magazine, Jewish Life, Jewish Currents, Science and Society, Cafeteria Call, Philippines Today, China and Us, World View, Rights and Guild Notes. Gollobin's latest contribution, "Dialectics and Wisdom" was published in Dialectics for the New Century (ed. Bertell Ollman and Tony Smith, Palgrave Macmillan, 2008).

Personal
Ira Gollobin was married to Esther Adler (January 16, 1943), until her untimely death on February 11, 1981 to cancer.  She was the first woman president of a local of the United Office and Professional Workers in 1942, and played a major role in the U.S.-China Peoples Friendship Association, the first private citizens' group to go to China in the wake of the Richard Nixon-Henry Kissinger trip in 1972.  They had two daughters who grew up on the Lower East Side of Manhattan.  He later married Ruth Axelbank Baharis, the one-time head of the Midwest ACPFB, on June 11, 1994; she died from complications of Alzheimer's on February 17, 2008 .  Gollobin died on April 4 ; besides his daughters he leaves along with the thousands of lives he touched.

References

External links
 Review of Ira Gollobin's "Dialectical Materialism" at @nti-dialectics
 Haitian Refugees Best Friend
 

1911 births
2008 deaths
New York (state) lawyers
Lawyers from Newark, New Jersey
20th-century American lawyers